The Ontario Association of Architects (OAA) is the regulatory body responsible for registering and licensing all architects legally entitled to practice the scope of architecture in the Province of Ontario, Canada.  It was founded in 1889.

Notable members 
 Alexandra Biriukova, first female member

References

External links 
Webpage

Architecture associations based in Canada
Professional associations based in Ontario
1889 establishments in Ontario